Ureaplasma diversum is a species of Ureaplasma, a genus of bacteria belonging to the family Mycoplasmataceae. It possesses the sequence accession no. (16S rRNA gene) for the type strain: D78650.

References

diversum